"Eat the Rich" is a song by British Rock 'N' Roll band Motörhead. It was released as a single in 1987, in 7" and 12" vinyl pressings. Both formats featured the b-side "Cradle to the Grave", and the 12" also included "Just 'Cos You Got the Power".

The title song was written for Peter Richardson's 1987 film Eat the Rich, starring the regular cast of The Comic Strip: the song also features on the Motörhead album Rock 'n' Roll

The Dutch single released by Roadrunner Records took the title track of the album as the A-side in place of "Eat the Rich", keeping "Cradle to the Grave" as the B-side. The sleeve used the artwork on the album cover,  both sleeve designs were created by Joe Petagno.

Track listing 
All tracks written by Lemmy, Würzel, Phil Campbell, Phil Taylor

7" 
 "Eat the Rich"
 "Cradle to the Grave"

12" 
 "Eat the Rich"
 "Cradle to the Grave"
 "Just 'cos You Got the Power"

Personnel 
Motörhead
 Lemmy – bass guitar, vocals
 Würzel – lead & rhythm guitars
 Phil "Wizzö" Campbell – lead & rhythm guitars, slide guitar on track 1
 Phil "Philthy Animal" Taylor – drums

Production
 Produced by – Motörhead and Guy Bidmead
 Originally recorded by Bill Laswell & Jason Corsaro, remixed by Guy Bidmead

References 

Motörhead songs
1987 singles
Albums with cover art by Joe Petagno
Songs written by Phil Taylor (musician)
Songs written by Lemmy
Songs written by Würzel
Songs written by Phil Campbell (musician)
1987 songs